Merajul Hoque (born 14 December 1986) is a Bangladeshi cricketer. He made his List A debut for Brothers Union in the 2016–17 Dhaka Premier Division Cricket League on 12 April 2017.

References

External links
 

1986 births
Living people
Bangladeshi cricketers
Brothers Union cricketers
Chittagong Division cricketers
Place of birth missing (living people)